Ralph W. Bottriel (died December 26, 1943) became the first American military person to jump from an aircraft using a manually-operated backpack parachute on 19 May 1919. He later received the Distinguished Flying Cross for this feat. Bottriel was considered "the dean of parachute jumpers" and made over 500 jumps. He died on December 26, 1943, of natural causes.

References

American military aviation
Recipients of the Distinguished Flying Cross (United States)
American skydivers
Year of birth missing
1943 deaths